Staryye Karashidy (İśke Qaraşiźe) is a rural locality (a village) in Ukteyevsky Selsoviet, Iglinsky District, Bashkortostan, Russia. The population was 132 as of 2010. There are 4 streets.

Geography 
Staryye Karashidy is located 7 km north of Iglino (the district's administrative centre) by road. Klyashevo is the nearest rural locality.

References 

Rural localities in Iglinsky District